Charles de Lauzirika (born August 17, 1967 in Los Angeles, California) is an American DVD and Blu-ray producer and filmmaker.

Early years
Lauzirika spent his early years in La Crescenta, California and attended Glendale College where he served as entertainment editor of In Focus, the college's weekly Public-access television show.  He also contributed to the school's weekly, El Vaquero, receiving several JACC student journalism awards for his work as editorial cartoonist, entertainment editor and editor-in-chief.  Lauzirika later attended the University of Southern California School of Cinematic Arts, where he wrote and directed a fully funded 16mm sync sound film in the program's  CNTV 480 Advanced Production Workshop; Lauzirika graduated in 1994.

Film and DVD career
While attending USC film school, Lauzirika concurrently worked for numerous film companies, including Lucasfilm Ltd., Lightstorm Entertainment, Warner Bros., Silver Pictures and Scott Free Productions.  While working as a story analyst for directors Ridley Scott and Tony Scott, Lauzirika was chosen by Ridley Scott to supervise and produce elaborate DVD special editions of Scott's classic films.  Lauzirika's works have been nominated for Video and DVD Premiere Awards, and in 2003 his comprehensive nine-disc Alien Quadrilogy garnered the DVDX Award for Best Overall DVD, Classic Movie.  In 2008, Lauzirika won two Saturn Awards for his work on Blade Runner (Best DVD Special Edition) and Twin Peaks (Best Retro Television Release). In 2011, he won his third Saturn Award for the Alien Anthology (Best DVD Movie Collection.) And in 2015, Lauzirika won his fourth Saturn Award for producing Twin Peaks The Entire Mystery (Best Blu-ray Television Release.) 

Lauzirika has been in charge of the restorations and new cuts of such as films as Alien³, Legend and Blade Runner: The Final Cut, each project requiring new visual effects and additional scenes which had to seamlessly blend in with existing footage.  He has also directed several commercials and short films, as well as the music video for Montell Jordan's When You Get Home (1998) which featured Billy Dee Williams.  Lauzirika himself occasionally serves as camera operator in his documentary interviews, thereby fostering a more intimate environment, allowing the interviewee to be more sharing on camera.  Although his work has long been associated with the films of Ridley Scott, Lauzirika has also produced DVD content for the works of numerous other directors, including David Lynch, Sam Raimi, James Cameron, the Coen brothers, Michael Bay, David Fincher, Robert Rodriguez, Marc Webb, John Badham, Jean-Pierre Jeunet, Mark Romanek and Tony Scott.

In 2010, Empire Magazine reported that Lauzirika was working on a comprehensive Blu-ray release of the four Alien films, now known as the Alien Anthology.  In addition to creating new content, he also oversaw a new sound mix of the Alien³ Special Edition which necessitated the return of certain actors to re-record their dialogue due to the poor production sound heard in the film's original rough assembly.  In 2011 it was reported that Lauzirika was working on DVD/Blu-ray special editions for such films as Transformers: Dark of the Moon, The Amazing Spider-Man and Prometheus.

Lauzirika made his feature directorial debut with the psychological thriller Crave which began shooting on October 23, 2009, in Detroit, Michigan, and stars Josh Lawson, Emma Lung, Edward Furlong and Ron Perlman.  Lauzirika is also one of the film's producers and co-wrote the screenplay with Robert A. Lawton.  Crave had its sold out world premiere at the Fantasia International Film Festival on July 24, 2012 and went on to win the New Flesh Award for Best First Feature Film. The film had its sold out United States premiere at Fantastic Fest in Austin, Texas on September 22, 2012, with Lauzirika going on to win Best Director in the festival's Next Wave competition. He is also attached to direct and co-write a feature adaptation of the Philip K. Dick science fiction short story, "I Hope I Shall Arrive Soon". In 2013, Lauzirika was named Jury President in the First Feature category at the Fantasia International Film Festival, the same category that Crave won the previous year.

Through 2018 and 2019, Lauzirika produced behind-the-scenes content for DC Universe 's Doom Patrol and Stargirl, as well a 71 minute documentary on the making of the Hellboy reboot directed by Neil Marshall. He also directed a short horror film titled Love Bite, starring Carlee Baker and Cuyle Carvin, and written by Baker and Lauzirika. The film had its world premiere at the Sitges Film Festival on October 6, 2019.

Selected Works: Documentaries

References

External links

 

1967 births
Living people
Film producers from California
American documentary filmmakers
People from La Crescenta-Montrose, California
Film directors from California